The 1997 Las Vegas 500K was the tenth and final round of the 1996–1997 Indy Racing League. The race was held on October 11, 1997 at the  Las Vegas Motor Speedway in Las Vegas, Nevada.

Qualifying

  Had an engine failure in the last practice session, and tried to qualify in a last-minute effort, only to wave off his attempt. He was allowed to start the race at the back of the field.
  Had an engine failure in the last practice session, and a spare was not ready on time. He was allowed to start the race at the back of the field.
  Changed to a backup car for the race, following a crash in a practice session after qualifying.

Race recap
The race began under cold and windy conditions that caused tire problems, which resulted in two accidents occurring immediately after pit stops. Greg Ray slid into the wall in turn-2 on lap 38, and about 25 laps later Sam Schmidt spun coming out of turn-2 and hit the wall. Buzz Calkins and Jack Miller both ran into debris from Schmidt's car, and all three were out. 

Pole sitter Billy Boat did not stay up front very long; Jeff Ward quickly took charge until he began having engine problems and then Mark Dismore moved into the lead. Affonso Giaffone took the lead on lap 100, but during a pit stop on lap 116 a wheel was not tightened properly and it came off as Giaffone pulled back onto the track, damaging the suspension and undercarriage. Giaffone would finish, but well back. 

Several drivers then dueled for the lead until Salazar took over; the veteran driver led most of the rest of the way and survived a two-lap sprint with Scott Goodyear after a late caution to win. The caution occurred when Roberto Guerrero touched wheels with a slower car and suffered a frightening accident; the car became airborne and then barrel-rolled through the infield grass on the backstretch. It was the first time an IRL car had been upside down during a live run, and the safety systems worked as planned: Guerrero walked away with minor injuries. 

Both of the championship contenders, Stewart and Davey Hamilton, had problems; Stewart won the title owing to the points lead that he had coming in. This race marked the first competition for the new Riley & Scott chassis, with Stan Wattles taking one to an eighth-place finish. Eliseo Salazar took home his first IRL victory as Tony Stewart clinched the 1997 championship.

Box score

Race Statistics
Lead changes: 13 among 10 drivers

Final standings after the race
Drivers' Championship standings

 Note: Only the top five positions are included for the standings.

References

External links
IndyCar official website

1996–97 in IndyCar
1997 in sports in Nevada
Motorsport in Las Vegas
Las Vegas 500K 1997